Ettumanoor Mahadeva temple is an ancient Shiva temple in Kottayam, Kerala, India. Temple tradition has it that the Pandavas and the sage Vyasa had worshipped at this temple.  The name of the place has its origin from the word manoor, which means "the land of deer." The temple is one of the major Shiva temples in Kerala, along with Vaikom Temple, Chengannur Mahadeva Temple, Kaduthruthy Mahadeva Temple, Ernakulam Shiva Temple, Vazhappally Maha Siva Temple and Vadakkunathan temple.

The Temple

The present temple building, with its gopuram and the fortress around it, was reconstructed in 717 ME (1542 AD).  There are Dravidian mural paintings on the walls inside and outside of the main entrance. The fresco of Pradosha Nritham (Dance of Shiva) is one of the finest wall paintings  in India. There is a golden flagstaff inside the temple topped with an idol of a bull surrounded by small bells and metal banyan tree leaves. In terms of architecture, these temples stand out to be an ultimate testament for the Vishwakarma Sthapathis for their engineering skills.  The temple roofs are covered with copper sheets, and it has 14 ornamental tops. Bhagavathi, Sastha, Dakshinamoorthy, Ganapathy and Yakshi are installed here as subordinate deities. There is a separate temple for Lord Krishna.  It is believed that the philosopher Adi Sankaracharya wrote  'Soundarya Lahari' while staying in the temple.

The origin of the name Ettumanoorappan is from Kattampakk, a small village in Kottayam district.

Vaippu Sthalam
It is one of the shrines of the Vaippu Sthalams sung by Tamil Saivite Nayanar Sundarar.

Festival

Ettumanoor Mahadeva Temple hosts the arattu festival, celebrated on a grand scale on the Thiruvathira day in February–March each year. Many people come to the temple on the 8th and 10th day of the festival, when seven and a half elephants (in Malayalam: ezharaponnaana) made of gold (nearly 13 Kgms) will be held in public view. This statue was donated to the temple by a travancore maharaja. The temple, one of the wealthiest Devaswoms in Kerala, has many valuable possessions.

The Thulabharam is one of the important rituals of this temple. People make offerings to God for favors received.  On balance, the child or man for whom offerings were promised to God, is weighed against offerings ranging from gold to fruits.

Ezharaponnana
Ezhara Ponnana refers to the seven-large sized and one small sized-golden elephant (that is called Ezharaponnana), all of which are kept in the temple vault and taken out once a year for darshan by the devotees. Of the eight statuettes, seven have a height of two ft., and the eighth one is half that size, hence the name Ezhara (seven-and- a- half) Ponnana (Golden elephants). According to legend, they were presented to the temple by Anizham Thirunal Marthanda Varma, the founder of the Travancore kingdom. According to another story, while Marthanda Varma had made the pledge to present the ‘ponnana’, the offering was made during the reign of his successor, Maharaja Karthika Thirunal. There are also differing stories about the reason for the offering: some believe it was offered as a penalty for the damages suffered by the temple during the annexation of Thekkumcore by Travancore; others believe it was the offering made when the marauding army of the Tipu Sultan was hammering on the gates of Travancore. The statuettes are made of a jackfruit tree and covered in gold plates weighing nearly 13 kg.

The Ezhara Ponnana Darshan is one of the high points of the temple festival, held at midnight on the eighth day of the ten-day festival. Ezhara Ponnana Darshan begins with the ceremonial procession of the eight golden elephant statuettes. They are later kept at the Asthana Mandapam for the annual darshan by the devotees.

Geography

Ettumanoor Mahadevar Temple is located between Ernakulam district and Kottayam district. It is 54 km from Ernakulam and 12kKm from Kottayam. The nearest towns to the temple are Kidangoor, Pala, and Kaduthuruty.

How to reach 

Train and bus services are available from Ernakulam City and Trivandrum City to Ettumanoor. Frequent buses, private and public (provided by the Kerala State Road Transport Corporation), are available from the town of Etumanoor to many parts of Kerala. Intercity buses to Bangalore, Chennai, Selam, Coimbathore, and Hosur are available in the evening and night. The nearest airport is Cochin International Airport.

Ettumanoor Mahadevar Temple is a major hub for devotees from other states visiting Sabarimala temple in Kerala.

See also
 108 Shiva Temples
 Ettumanoor
 Temples of Kerala

References

External links
 Christian family donates 50-year-old teak tree for Ettumanoor Temple
 History of Shiva linga at Ettumanoor Mahadeva temple
 Ettumanoor Mahadeva temple

Hindu temples in Kottayam district
Shiva temples in Kerala
108 Shiva Temples